Josip Colina (born 8 November 1980) is a Bosnian-Herzegovinian retired football player who last played for Swiss club FC Lugano on loan from Grasshopper Club Zürich. He also holds Swiss citizenship.

Club career
On 2 July 2007, he signed a contract with Grasshopper, a first Super League club.

External links
Football.ch profile

1980 births
Living people
Sportspeople from Zenica
Croats of Bosnia and Herzegovina
Swiss people of Bosnia and Herzegovina descent
Swiss people of Croatian descent
Association football central defenders
Bosnia and Herzegovina footballers
Swiss men's footballers
FC Basel players
FC Wangen bei Olten players
FC Concordia Basel players
S.S.D. Varese Calcio players
Grasshopper Club Zürich players
FC Lugano players
Swiss Super League players
Serie C players
Swiss Challenge League players
Bosnia and Herzegovina expatriate footballers
Expatriate footballers in Switzerland
Bosnia and Herzegovina expatriate sportspeople in Switzerland
Expatriate footballers in Italy
Bosnia and Herzegovina expatriate sportspeople in Italy